Sunil Kumar ( 11 January 1966 – 4 March 2007) was a member of the 14th Lok Sabha of India, representing the constituency of Jamshedpur in the eastern state of Jharkhand. He was General Secretary of the Jharkhand Mukti Morcha (JMM) political party. He was assassinated by Naxalite rebels who subscribe to Communist ideology.

Early life

Mahato was from a Kudmi family. In 2003 he was part of a delegation that met with the Governor of Jharkhand asking for recognition as a scheduled tribe.

Political career
Mahato was General Secretary of the Jharkhand Mukti Morcha party. He was elected to Lok Sabha in the 2004 general election; Abha Mahato of the BJP came in second. On 4 March 2007 he was shot dead by Communist rebels near Ghatsila in East Singhbhum district while he was attending a local football match organised to mark the Hindu festival of Holi. The attackers also killed the Ghatsila block secretary of JMM, Prabhakar Mahato, and two or four of Sunil Mahato's bodyguards. There were reported to be approximately 30 attackers, including three women.

References

External links
 Home Page on the Parliament of India's Website

1966 births
2007 deaths
India MPs 2004–2009
Jharkhand Mukti Morcha politicians
People from Seraikela Kharsawan district
Lok Sabha members from Jharkhand
Assassinated Indian politicians
People murdered in Jharkhand
People from Jamshedpur